Ghanpuram is a village and a mandal in Mulugu district in the state of Telangana in India.

Culture 
Kota Gullu are a group of 12th century stone temples that are located in Ghanpur. They are known for their marvelous architecture and has been among the notable destinations in the district.

References 

Mandal headquarters of Telangana
Villages in Mulugu district